Abdul Aziz or Abdul-Aziz may refer to:
 Abd al-Aziz, a male Arabic theophoric name, commonly abbreviated as Aziz

People 
 Sultan Abdulaziz (1830–1876), sultan of the Ottoman Empire
 King Abdulaziz Ibn Saud (1876–1953), founder of Saudi Arabia
 Abdul Azeez Madani (1950–2022), Indian Islamic scholar.
 Abdul Aziz (athlete) (born 1924), Pakistani sprinter
 Abdul Aziz (cricketer, born 1905) (1905–1979), Afghan-born Indian cricketer
 Abdul Aziz (cricketer, born 1941) (1941–1959), Pakistani cricketer
 Abdul Aziz (cricketer, born 1992), Pakistani cricketer
 Abdul Aziz (footballer) (born 1986), Pakistani footballer
 Abdul Aziz (Pakistani cleric) (born 1963), Pakistani cleric and khateeb (sermon giver)
 Abdul Aziz (filmmaker) (born 1975), Bengali and Dhallywood film director, producer and script writer
 Abdul Aziz (Sri Lankan politician) (1921–1990), Indian-born Ceylonese politician and trade unionist
 Abdul Aziz (Indonesian politician) (born 1970), Indonesian politician
 Abdul Aziz (Bangladeshi politician), Bangladesh Awami League politician
 Abdul Aziz (Indian politician) (born 1969), Indian politician
 Abdul Aziz (wrestler) (born 1935), Pakistani Olympic wrestler
 Abdul Aziz Wahabzada, a survivor of the Christchurch mosque shootings in March 2019 credited with stopping the attack at the Linwood Islamic Centre
 Mahmoud Mohamed Ahmed Bahaziq (born 1943), a jihadist using the Abu 'Abd al-'Aziz pseudonym
 Abdulaziz Haqqani, a leader of the Haqqani network in Afghanistan
 Abdel Aziz al-Muqrin, leader of al-Qaeda in Saudi Arabia
 Linda Abdul Aziz Menuhin (born 1950), Iraqi-born Israeli journalist, editor, and blogger
 Robin Padilla, Filipino actor and politician using Abdul Aziz as his Muslim name

Places 
King Abdulaziz University, Jeddah, Saudi Arabia
King Abdulaziz International Airport, Jeddah, Saudi Arabia
King Abdulaziz City for Science and Technology, Riyadh, Saudi Arabia
King Abdulaziz Naval Base, Saudi Arabia
King Abdul Aziz Stadium, Mecca, Saudi Arabia
King Abdul Aziz Historical Centre, Riyadh, Saudi Arabia
King Abdul Aziz Mosque, Marbella, Spain
Prince Abdul Aziz bin Musa'ed Stadium, Ha'il, Saudi Arabia
Prince Abdulaziz Bin Mousaed Economic City, proposed city in Saudi Arabia
Stade Abdelaziz Chtioui, football stadium in Tunisia
Sultan Abdul Aziz Shah Airport, Subang, Malaysia
Sultan Abdul Aziz Shah Airport Highway, Selangor, Malaysia
Sultan Salahuddin Abdul Aziz Mosque, Selangor, Malaysia
Sultan Abdul Aziz Shah Jamek Mosque, Selangor, Malaysia
Tun Abdul Aziz Mosque, Selangor, Malaysia
Abdul-Aziz al-Samarrai Mosque, Fallujah, Iraq
Sultan Salahuddin Abdul Aziz Power Station, Selangor, Malaysia
Sultan Salahuddin Abdul Aziz Shah Building, Selangor, Malaysia
Sultan Salahuddin Abdul Aziz Shah Bridge, Selangor, Malaysia
Sultan Abdul Aziz Shah Golf and Country Club, golf club in Selangor, Malaysia
`Abd al `Aziz, Qatar, settlement in Qatar
Sidi Abdelaziz, town in Algeria

Roads
Jalan Raja Muda Abdul Aziz, road in Kuala Lumpur, Malaysia
Persiaran Sultan Salahuddin Abdul Aziz Shah, Putrajaya, road in Malaysia

Other uses
Prince Abdulaziz (yacht), Saudi yacht
Order of Abdulaziz al Saud, Saudi Order of Merit

Aziz, Abdul